Buglossoporus eucalypticola is a species of poroid fungus in the family Fomitopsidaceae. It was described as a new species in 2016 by mycologists Mei-Ling Han, Bao-Kai Cui, and Yu-Cheng Dai. The type specimen was collected in the Danzhou Tropical Botanical Garden, in Danzhou, China. It was growing on a dead Eucalyptus tree. The surface colour when fresh is peach to brownish orange, but when dry becomes clay-pink to cinnamon. The pore surface on the cap underside is initially white before becoming pinkish buff or clay-buff to dark brown. B. eucalypticola causes a brown rot in its host.

References

Fungi of China
Fomitopsidaceae
Fungi described in 2016
Taxa named by Yu-Cheng Dai
Taxa named by Bao-Kai Cui